Unni is a Norwegian female given name that may refer to
Unni Anisdahl (born 1947), Norwegian handball player and sports reporter 
Unni Bernhoft (born 1933), Norwegian actress
Unni Birkrem, Norwegian handball goalkeeper
Unni Drougge (born 1956), Swedish author and journalist. At an early age she dropped out of high school
Unni Holmen (born 1952), Norwegian Olympic gymnast
Unni Kristiansen, Norwegian biathlete
Unni Larsen (born 1959), Norwegian cyclist
Unni Lehn (born 1977), Norwegian football midfielder
Unni Lindell (born 1957), Norwegian writer
Unni Løvlid (born 1976), Norwegian musician
Unni Nyhamar Hinkel, Norwegian handball player
Unni Straume (born 1955), Norwegian film director and screenwriter
Unni Wilhelmsen (born 1971), Norwegian singer, songwriter and musician

See also 
 Unnur

Norwegian feminine given names